Robert J. Clendening (April 24, 1914 – July 28, 1982) was an American politician from Pennsylvania who served as a Republican member of the Pennsylvania House of Representatives for Delaware County from 1949 to 1952.

Early life
Clendening was born in Washington, D.C. and attended public schools in Upper Darby, Pennsylvania.  He graduated from the University of Pennsylvania with a B.S. in 1937.  He served in the United States Army 80th Infantry Division during World War II and was a Bronze Star Medal recipient.

Career
Clendening was elected to the Pennsylvania House of Representatives for Delaware County and served from 1949 to 1952.

He is interred at the Arlington Cemetery in the Drexel Hill section of Upper Darby.

References

1914 births
1982 deaths
20th-century American politicians
United States Army personnel of World War II
Burials at Arlington Cemetery (Pennsylvania)
Republican Party members of the Pennsylvania House of Representatives
People from Upper Darby Township, Pennsylvania
People from Washington, D.C.
University of Pennsylvania alumni